Mazzo is a surname of Italian origin. Notable people with the surname include:

 Carolyne Mazzo (born 1997), Brazilian swimmer
 Kay Mazzo (born 1946), American former ballet dancer and educator
 Lucas Mazzo (born 1994), Brazilian racewalking athlete

See also 

 Mazza (disambiguation)
 Mazza (surname)
 Mazzi
 Mazo (surname)

Italian-language surnames